"Tell Me (I'll Be Around)" (originally titled "Tell Me Your Name") is a song performed by Shades, issued as the lead single from their eponymous debut album. The song contains a sample of "Who Do You Love" by Bernard Wright. It was the group's highest chart appearance on the Billboard Hot 100, peaking at #50 in 1996.

Chart positions

References

External links
 

1996 songs
1996 debut singles
Motown singles
Shades (band) songs
Song recordings produced by Troy Taylor (record producer)
Songs written by Troy Taylor (record producer)
Songs written by Shannon Walker Williams
Songs written by Bernard Wright